The 1988 Wan Chai District Board election was held on 10 March 1988 to elect all 10 elected members to the 16-member Wan Chai District Board.

Overall election results
Before election:

Change in composition:

Results by constituency

Causeway Bay Central

Happy Valley

Tai Hang and So Kon Po

Wan Chai East

Wan Chai West

See also
 1988 Hong Kong local elections

References

Wan Chai District Board election
Wan Chai District Council elections